Anna Nightingale (born 1990/1991) is an English actress. She is known for her roles in the television series Mouth to Mouth (2009), Doctors (2013) and in the British soap opera Emmerdale (2019–2021).

Life and career
Nightingale trained at the BRIT School in London, alongside classmates Adele, Amy Winehouse and Jessie J. She made her film debut in the 2007 short film Alice in the City, with her television debut airing in 2009 in an episode of Ashes to Ashes. She then appeared in various television series including Casualty, Doctors and My Mad Fat Diary. In 2019, it was announced that she had been cast in the ITV soap opera Emmerdale as series regular Andrea Tate. She left the series on 21 October 2021 after she was killed off.

In 2020, Nightingale joined the supergroup known as the Celebs to raise money for both Alzheimer's Society and Action for Children. They recorded a new rendition of "Merry Christmas Everyone" by Shakin' Stevens and it was released digitally on 11 December 2020, on independent record label Saga Entertainment. The music video debuted on Good Morning Britain the day before release. The song peaked at number two on the iTunes pop chart. In 2022, Nightingale finished in second place on BBC's Celebrity Mastermind.

Filmography

Film

Television

References

External links
 

1990s births
21st-century English actresses
English film actresses
English stage actresses
English television actresses
English voice actresses
Living people
People educated at the BRIT School